The Canadian AIDS Society (CAS) is a national coalition of community-based AIDS service organizations across Canada. Registered as a charity since 1988, CAS has a mandate to improve the response to HIV/AIDS in Canada across all sectors of society, and to support people and communities living with HIV/AIDS.

History

Establishment
CAS was established after the first two national conferences on HIV/AIDS in Montreal (1985) and Toronto (1986) to act as a national umbrella organization for AIDS service organizations in Canada. The original founding member organizations were:
 AIDS Calgary Awareness Association
 AIDS Committee of London
 AIDS Committee of Ottawa
 AIDS Committee of Thunder Bay
 AIDS Committee of Toronto
 AIDS Committee of Windsor
 AIDS Network of Edmonton
 AIDS Regina
 AIDS Saskatoon
 AIDS Vancouver
 AIDS Vancouver Island
 Comité sida aide Montréal (C-SAM)
 Metro Area Committee on AIDS (Halifax)
 Newfoundland and Labrador AIDS Association
 Winnipeg Gay Community Health Centre

Before CAS became a registered charitable organization with paid staff in Ottawa in 1988, a voluntary secretariat steered the organization operating out of the AIDS Network of Edmonton office.

Objective
CAS's objective is to strengthen the response to HIV/AIDS in Canada and enrich the lives of people and communities living with, and affected by, HIV/AIDS.

Structure

Member organizations
CAS represents AIDS service organizations across Canada in almost every Province.  A full list of member organizations is available on CAS's website.

National partners
CAS collaborates with other nationally focused organizations the address HIV/AIDS in Canada. These partners include:
 Canadian Association for HIV Research (CAHR)
 Canadian Public Health Association (CPHA)
 Interagency Coalition on AIDS and Development (ICAD)
 Canadian HIV/AIDS Legal Network
 realize (formerly CWGHR)
 CATIE
 CTAC
 Canadian Aboriginal AIDS Network
 CIHR Canadian HIV Trials Network

Governance 
CAS is governed by a board of directors that includes two representatives from each region of Canada, one of whom must by HIV-positive. Additionally, CAS has two at-large board of director seats for one man and one woman to ensure gender diverse representation at the board level. There is also one board of director seat reserved for an HIV-positive young person.

Funding
CAS has historically been funded by the Federal government through Health Canada and/or the Public Health Agency of Canada, however since the Liberals reorganized funding priorities for HIV and Hepatitis-C in 2016 CAS has received no federal funding. This change in funding, and the general under-funding of HIV/AIDS service organizations in Canada more broadly, resulted in sharp criticism of the Liberal government, particularly by CAS's national partner, the Canadian HIV/AIDS Legal Network.

Notable programs and campaigns

AIDS Awareness Week and World AIDS Day
From 1991 to 2001 CAS ran an annual AIDS Awareness Week campaign with support from various governmental, corporate, and charitable organizations including Health and Welfare Canada, the Public Health Agency of Canada, the Canadian Hemophilia Society, Levi Strauss & Co., and others. AIDS Awareness Week took place in October, but after this project came to an end when the Public Health Agency of Canada stopped funding for it, CAS's awareness campaigns largely revolved around World AIDS Day of each year.  Each year's AIDS Awareness Week campaign, was organized around a theme. Ads were often developed by Ottawa creative agency McMillan and appeared in wide-circulation magazines and periodicals including Maclean's, L'actualité, and The Globe and Mail.

AIDS Memorial Quilt
The Canadian AIDS Memorial Quilt was a project initiated by AIDS activists in Halifax, NS who organized a tour of the American AIDS Memorial Quilt throughout Canada in 1989 which resulted in the creation of hundreds of Canadian quilt panels. In 1992, the activists that began the project passed stewardship of the quilt onto CAS, but in 1994 The NAMES project | le projet des NOMS - Canada was established with Lawrence Eisener as the founding executive director. John Mactavish and John Stinson were also involved in the establishing of the organization which took over stewardship of the quilt.  The NAMES project - Canada maintained and grew the quilt from 400 panels in 1993 to over 600 panels today. The quilt was response to the AIDS epidemic affecting the country at the time. Central goals of the quilt were: 1) To commemorate the lives of Canadians who had died of AIDS-related illnesses; 2) to raise funds for community-based AIDS service organization. In 2013 The NAMES project - Canada dissolved and once again CAS became the steward of the quilt. A new digital version of the quilt was launched by CAS in 2018 and is available online at quilt.ca.

AIDS walk
Since 1988, Canadian AIDS Society participate in numerous walks to raise money for the organization and to raise awareness on HIV/AIDS.

National HIV Testing Day
On June 27, 2017, CAS launched a national initiative to encourage people to be tested for HIV.  Over forty community organizations participated across all regions of Canada by offering free HIV tests to anyone who wanted one. National Testing Day in Canada, much like its American counterpart that was established in 1995, encourages the use of Point-of-Care Testing (POCT) where participants can get their results in a few minutes as opposed two-weeks later. A 2016 study on the efficacy of National Testing Day in the United States indicates that the program successfully tested more people from priority populations and identified more previously undiagnosed HIV-positive people than during control weeks.

References

Medical and health organizations based in Canada
HIV/AIDS organizations